Mahamevnawa may refer to:
Mahamevnāwa Park in Anuradhapura
Mahamevnawa Buddhist Monastery, Sri Lanka